Muhammed Enes Durmuş (born 8 January 1997) is a Turkish professional footballer who plays as a midfielder for Kastamonuspor 1966 on loan from İstanbulspor.

Professional career
Muhammed Enes transferred to Göztepe in July 2017 from the Beşiktaş academy. He made his professional debut for Göztepe in a 1-0 Süper Lig loss to Kayserispor on 20 August 2017.

References

External links
 
 
 

1997 births
Sportspeople from Zonguldak
Living people
Turkish footballers
Turkey youth international footballers
Turkey under-21 international footballers
Association football midfielders
Göztepe S.K. footballers
Gaziantep F.K. footballers
İstanbulspor footballers
Balıkesirspor footballers
Şanlıurfaspor footballers
İskenderun FK footballers
Süper Lig players
TFF First League players
TFF Second League players